Dr Pepper is a carbonated soft drink.

Dr Pepper may also refer to:


Beverages
 Keurig Dr Pepper, an American beverage company
 Dr Pepper Snapple Group Inc., a business unit of Keurig Dr Pepper based in Plano, Texas
 Dr Pepper/Seven Up, a predecessor company founded in 1986
 Dr Pepper Snapple Bottling Group, a predecessor company founded in 2006
 Flaming Doctor Pepper, flammable cocktail mixing Amaretto with high proof liquor

People
 John Henry Pepper, a British inventor
 Dr. William Pepper, American physician
 Dr. William F. Pepper, English and American barrister

Sports venues
 Dr Pepper Arena, a facility in Frisco, Texas that hosts Dallas Stars hockey and basketball
 Dr Pepper Ballpark, a minor-league baseball stadium in Frisco, Texas

See also